The second USS Greyhound (SP-437) was a United States Navy patrol vessel in commission from 1917 to 1919.

Greyhound was built in 1916 as a private motorboat of the same name by the Great Lakes Boatbuilding Corporation at Milwaukee, Wisconsin. On 20 June 1917, the U.S. Navy purchased Greyhound at Key West, Florida, from Mrs. Ida W. Seybert for use as a section patrol vessel during World War I. She was commissioned as USS Greyhound (SP-437).

Assigned to the 7th Naval District, Greyhound served on patrol duty in Florida waters at Tampa Bay and in Key West Harbor for the remainder of World War I and into 1919.

Decommissioned after World War I, Greyhound was sold on 2 July 1919.

References

Department of the Navy Naval History and Heritage Command Online Library of Selected Images: U.S. Navy Ships Listed by Hull Number: "SP" #s and "ID" #s -- World War I Era Patrol Vessels and other Acquired Ships and Craft numbered from SP-400 through SP-499
NavSource Online: Section Patrol Craft Photo Archive: Greyhound (SP 437)

Patrol vessels of the United States Navy
World War I patrol vessels of the United States
Ships built in Milwaukee
1916 ships